Partho Sen-Gupta (also spelled Partho Sen Gupta or Partho Sengupta pronounced Partho Shen-Goopto) is an  independent film director and screenwriter. He is an Australian and French dual citizen, of Indian origin. He has a post-graduate degree in Film Direction from the FEMIS.

Biography
Sen-Gupta was born in Mumbai (Bombay), on 2 September 1965. He has been working in cinema since the age of seventeen, starting his career as an apprentice in the art department, in the studios of "Bollywood" in Mumbai. He worked with an Indian art director Bijon Dasgupta on the sets of big-budget commercial Hindi films like Saagar and Mr. India among others.

After having spent a few years finishing his apprenticeship, he became assistant art director. In 1988, he worked on his first film as art director or production designer in an Indian art movie called Main  Zinda Hoon (I am Alive) directed by Sudhir Mishra. He then set up his design studio working on numerous advertising films and art movies, designing sets and specializing in real-time SFX. He won the Best Art Director Award in 1989. He also worked as production designer on the French film Nocturne Indien directed by Alain Corneau and shot in Mumbai.

In 1993, he was selected to do a two-month summer workshop at FEMIS, the French film institute in Paris. During the workshop, he directed his first short film, "La Derniere..." based on Samuel Beckett's radio play Krapp's Last Tape. He was then awarded a three-and-a-half-year full scholarship to study film direction at the same school.

During his film school years, he made four short fiction films Le Cochon, La Partition, Trajet Discontinu, and La Petite Souris which took him to different European film festivals and won awards.

After graduation in 1997, he directed his first feature film Hava Aney Dey (Let the Wind Blow), which premiered at the Berlin Film Festival in 2004. It was selected in many international film festivals and won awards. The film was part of the Global Lens 2008 series of the Global Film Initiative. and premiered at the MoMA NYC, in January 2008.

In 2005, he made a documentary film The Way of Beauty on the Indo-fusion group Shakti which was released on the DVD in May 2006.

In 2008, his new feature film project Sunrise, was selected among 30 other international projects at the 11th Pusan Promotion Plan (3 to 6 October 2008) at the Pusan International Film Festival. Sunrise was the only Indian project in the selection.

Sunrise was completed and released in October 2014 and premiered at the 2014 Busan International Film Festival and numerous international film festivals, received awards and international critical acclaim.

In 2017, Sen-Gupta wrote and directed his first Australian feature film Slam. It was an official selected project at the 2016 International Film Festival Rotterdam's CineMart  and the 2016 Berlinale Co-oproduction Market. The film starring Adam Bakri, from the Academy Awards nominated film Omar and award winning Australian actress Rachael Blake, was filmed in October and  November 2017 in Sydney, Australia.

Slam is selected in the Official Selection Competition at the 2018 Tallinn Black Nights Film Festival and had its world premiere on 27 November 2018.

Sen-Gupta has worked as Senior Lecturer for the Masters in Directing at the Australian Film, Television, Radio School AFTRS since 2021.

Filmography

Writer/Director
Slam - 2018/Fiction/115 min/English
Sunrise - 2014/Fiction/85 min/Marathi
The Way of Beauty - 2006/Documentary/180 min/English
Hava Aney Dey (Let the Wind Blow) - 2004/Fiction/93 min/Hindi
Trajet Discontinu - 1998/Fiction/26 min/French
Le Cochon - 1996/Fiction/12min/French

Production Designer/Art Director
Nocturne Indien - 1989/Fiction/110 min/French
Raakh - 1989/Fiction/153 min/Hindi
Main Zinda Hoon - 1988/Fiction/120 min/Hindi

References

External links

Official Website
2004 interview in Nantes, Festival de 3 continents
Arunoday - Sunrise - A film by Partho Sen-Gupta

1965 births
Living people
Film directors from Mumbai
Hindi-language film directors
Bengali male artists
Indian production designers
20th-century Indian designers